MTV Ukraine was a Ukrainian free-to-air television music channel operated by GDF Media Limited under licence from VIMN Europe. The channel was launched on 24 August 2007, 6:00 a.m. and was replaced on 31 May 2013 by a new youth-orientated music and general entertainment channel called Zoom.

Channel rebrand
On 31 May 2013 the operators of MTV in Ukraine, 'GDF Media' announced that the channel would cease operating from 23:00 on 31 May 2013 and would be rebranded as Zoom. The decision to replace MTV with a new channel was decided by GDF Media, as the owners of the licence to operate the Ukrainian version of MTV felt the brand is no-longer relevant to the demographic the channel is targeting. The decision to replace MTV Ukraine with Zoom came shortly after MTV Russia was closed down as a free-to-air television network and relaunched on pay television. At the same year, MTV Brasil was also closed down as a free-to-air television network by Grupo Abril and relaunched on pay television by Viacom Latin America.

References

External links
 MTV Ukraine official website
 MTV Ukraine official LiveJournal community

MTV
Defunct television stations in Ukraine
Television channels and stations established in 2007
Television channels and stations disestablished in 2013
Music organizations based in Ukraine
2007 establishments in Ukraine
2013 disestablishments in Ukraine